Sport Vereniging Dakota (English:Sports Club), known as SV Dakota or simply Dakota is an Aruban football club based in Oranjestad, Dakota, which currently play in Aruba's first division.

Achievements
Aruban Division di Honor: 17

 1961, 1962, 1963, 1965, 1966, 1969, 1970, 1971, 1974, 1976, 1980, 1981, 1982, 1983, 1995, 2017–18, 2021-22

Aruban Division Uno: 1
 2010-11

Torneo Copa Betico Croes: 2
2007, 2019
 Finalist: 4
 2011, 2016, 2017, 2019

 Copa Juliana: 6
 1960, 1962, 1963, 1967, 1968, 1969

Netherlands Antilles Championship: 0
 Finalist: 4
 1962, 1963, 1970, 1983

Performance in CONCACAF competitions
CONCACAF Champions' Cup: 1 appearance
1983 – 2nd Round (Caribbean) – Lost against  SV Robinhood 5 – 1 on aggregate (stage 2 of 4)

Current squad
As of 10 September 2022

Current technical staff

External links
Official site
Facebook page

References

Dakota